Lepa may refer to:

People
 Astrid Lepa (1924–2015), Estonian actress and director
 Margus Lepa (born 1953), Estonian radio journalist and actor

Places
 Palma de Mallorca Airport, assigned the ICAO code LEPA
 Lepa, Samoa village in Samoa
 Lepa, Estonia village in Estonia
 Lepa Ves, village in Croatia

Science
 LEPA, low-energy precision application irrigation
 Leader peptidase A (LepA), elongation factor (biology)
 Lepas, a genus of goose barnacles

Other uses 
 Lepa (ship), the traditional houseboats of the Sama-Bajau people
 Lepa (given name), a feminine given name

See also